The 1971–72 South-West Indian Ocean cyclone season was a below-average cyclone season. The season officially ran from November 1, 1971, to April 30, 1972.

Systems

Moderate Tropical Storm Odette 

Odette existed from July 9 to July 16.

Severe Tropical Storm Agnes 

Agnes existed from December 9 to December 24. Rainbands from Agnes affected Réunion while the storm passed to the north.

Moderate Tropical Storm Belle 

Belle existed from January 1 to January 5.

Moderate Tropical Storm Caroline 

Caroline existed from February 3 to February 14.

Moderate Tropical Storm Dolly 

Dolly existed from February 4 to February 9. On February 7, Dolly brushed the southwest coast of Réunion, bringing days of heavy rainfall that reached  at Piton Tortue. The rains damaged crops and flooded coastal roads. Dolly killed five people on the island.

Tropical Cyclone Eugenie 

Rainfall from the storm spread from Swaziland to Durban in South Africa, reaching over  near the coast. The rains caused widespread river flooding.

Intense Tropical Cyclone Fabienne 

Fabienne existed from February 11 to February 25. The storm caused two fatalities on the island, as well as 16 injuries.

Tropical Cyclone Tessie–Gigi 

This system entered the basin on February 27 and became extratropical by February 28.

Tropical Cyclone Hermione 

Hermione existed from March 1 to March 11. On March 5, Hermione passed north of the Mascarene Islands, producing heavy rainfall on Réunion that reached  at Foc Foc.

See also 

 Atlantic hurricane seasons: 1971, 1972
 Eastern Pacific hurricane seasons: 1971, 1972
 Western Pacific typhoon seasons: 1971, 1972
 North Indian Ocean cyclone seasons: 1971, 1972

References 

1971–72 Southern Hemisphere tropical cyclone season
South-West Indian Ocean cyclone seasons